Joshua Marshall (1628–1678)  was a 17th century English mason and sculptor. As the King's Master Mason at the time of the Great Fire of London he was responsible for many of the rebuilding projects and worked closely with Christopher Wren and was the builder of several "Wren churches".

Life

He was born in a house on Fetter Lane in London on 24 June 1628 the eldest son of Edward Marshall and became the Warden of the Worshipful Company of Masons
in 1666 and became Master of the Company in 1670. He was further appointed Master Mason to the Crown in place of his father and as such worked on several Royal palaces.

Marshall lived in the parish of St Bride's Church and attended church there. He had premises on Shoe Lane just off Fleet Street. As Master Mason to the King and as a regular contractor for the works of Wren he was one of the many masons who worked on St Paul's Cathedral but his specific work on the cathedral is not clear.

He was the principal builder of The Monument to the Great Fire of London and was paid the huge sum of £11,300 for this task out of the total cost of £13,450. (around £1.9 million in 2021)

He died in London on 6 April 1678. He was buried at St Dunstan-in-the-West. In his will he left £200 to be given to the widows of masons in London.

Works

Monument to Sir William Thorold at St Giles-in-the-Fields (1649)
Monument to John Whatton in Leicester Cathedral (1656)
Monument to Elizabeth Sherard at North Witham (1658)
Monument to John Turner at Kirkleatham (1659)
Monument to Henry Hammond at Hampton Lovett (1660)
Monument to Richard Brownlow at St Peter and St Paul's Church, Belton (c.1660) erected several decades after Brownlow died
Monument to Lady Frances Kniveton at St Giles-in-the-Fields (1663)
Monument to Lady Anne Holbourne at St Giles-in-the-Fields (1663)
Monument to Lord and Lady Noel at Chipping Campden (1664)
Chimney-pieces for the Palace of Whitehall (1664 to 1667)
Monument to Bishop John Warner in Rochester Cathedral (1666)
Frontage of the Palace of Whitehall facing onto the Thames (1666/7)
North facade and internal fireplaces at Greenwich Palace (1666/7)
Repairs to Rochester Cathedral (1667)
Church of St Sepulchre-without-Newgate in London (1667–1670) to his own design.
Coat-of-Arms at Cleave's Almhouses in Kingston, Surrey (1670)
Temple Bar Gate (1670–72) aided by Thomas Strong (relocated in 20th century)
St Mary-at-Hill Church with Wren (1670–1676)
St Bride's Church, Fleet Street with Wren (1670–1684)
Monument to Lady Dame Dyonis Williamson at St Dunstans-in-the-East (1671)
New Customs House at Sugar Quay (1671) designed by Christopher Wren to replace the Old Customs House destroyed in the Great Fire of London
Construction of The Monument to the Great Fire of London (1671 to 1673) designed by Christopher Wren and Robert Hooke
St Mary Aldermary (Aldermanbury) with Wren (1671)
Ornate Pedestal for the equestrian statue of King Charles I at Charing Cross (1675)
Monument to Sir Geoffrey Palmer, 3rd Baronet and Lady Palmer at East Carlton (1675)
Monument to William Cleave at Cleave's Almhouses in Kingston, Surrey (1676)
St Stephen Coleman Street Church with Wren (1677) destroyed in Blitz
St Peter upon Cornhill Church with Wren (1677–1684)
Monument to the Princes in the Tower in Westminster Abbey (1678)
St Swithin, London Stone Church with Wren (1678) completed by others, damaged in Blitz, later demolished
St Clement Danes Church with Wren (1678–1682) spire added by James Gibbs in 1719 – destroyed in Blitz rebuilt in replica

Family
He was married to Catherine George daughter of John George. They had five children but only one daughter and two sons survived to adulthood: Anne, John and Edward. Anne married Richard Somers of the Inner Temple.

Gallery

References
 

1628 births
1678 deaths
Great Fire of London
People from London
English sculptors